Heartley William "Hunk" Anderson (September 22, 1898 – April 24, 1978) was an American football player and coach. He served as the head football coach at the Saint Louis University (1928–1929), University of Notre Dame (1931–1933), and North Carolina State University (1934–1936), compiling a career college football record of 34–34–4. From 1942 to 1945, Anderson was the head coach for the Chicago Bears of the National Football League (NFL), tallying a mark of 24–12 and winning the 1943 NFL Championship.

From 1918 to 1921, Anderson played as a guard for the Notre Dame football team, under new head coach Knute Rockne. During his time in South Bend he played under an assumed name for the Canton Bulldogs in 1920-1921, but Anderson later argued that he had only played in exhibition games. From 1922 to 1926, he played professionally for the Cleveland Indians and the Chicago Bears. Anderson played in 39 career games while starting in 32 of them. In 1939, he was an assistant coach for the Detroit Lions under Gus Henderson.

Born in Calumet, Michigan, on the Keweenaw Peninsula in the Upper Peninsula, Anderson attended Calumet High School. Anderson was named to the National Football League 1920s All-Decade Team, and is one of only two players on the list not in the Pro Football Hall of Fame. He was inducted into the College Football Hall of Fame as a player in 1974.

A head coach at Saint Louis for two years, he returned to Notre Dame as an assistant under Rockne in 1930 and the Irish won all ten games.

Head coaching record

College

NFL

Personal life 
Anderson was a Freemason.

References

External links
 
 

1898 births
1978 deaths
American football guards
American Freemasons
Chicago Bears coaches
Chicago Bears head coaches
Chicago Bears players
Cleveland Indians (NFL 1923) players
Detroit Lions coaches
Michigan Wolverines football coaches
Notre Dame Fighting Irish football coaches
Notre Dame Fighting Irish football players
Saint Louis Billikens football coaches
College Football Hall of Fame inductees
People from Calumet, Michigan
Coaches of American football from Michigan
Players of American football from Michigan